Simon Barr (born 12 September 1985) is a German lightweight rower. 

Barr was educated at Eastbourne College, where he was introduced to rowing. He studied Chemistry at Durham University and competed in lightweight rowing with the Durham University Boat Club. He represented Great Britain at the 2006 World University Rowing Championships. 

Later switching nationality to Germany, he won the gold medal at the 2014 World Rowing Championships in Amsterdam with the lightweight men's eight.

References

1985 births
Living people
German male rowers
World Rowing Championships medalists for Germany
Alumni of Hatfield College, Durham
Durham University Boat Club rowers
People educated at Eastbourne College